Ricardo Marques Ribeiro (born 18 June 1979) is a Brazilian professional football referee. He has been a full international for FIFA since 2009. He refereed some matches in Copa Libertadores.

References 

1979 births
Living people
Brazilian football referees